Golujeh (also Romanized as Golūjeh, Galoojeh, Galūjeh, and Gollūjeh; also known as Golūjeh Bālā, Gulūja Yukāri, Gyulyudzha-Yukhari, Kūlūjeh Yokhārī, and Kūlūjeh Yūkhārī) is a village in Esperan Rural District, in the Central District of Tabriz County, East Azerbaijan Province, Iran. At the 2006 census, its population was 224, in 67 families.

References 

Populated places in Tabriz County